Bermuda competed in the 2014 Commonwealth Games in Glasgow, Scotland from 23 July – 3 August 2014. A team of eighteen athletes in six sports was announced on 20 June 2014.

Athletics

Men

Field event

Women
Field event

Combined events – Heptathlon

Key
Note–Ranks given for track events are within the athlete's heat only
Q = Qualified for the next round
q = Qualified for the next round as a fastest loser or, in field events, by position without achieving the qualifying target
NR = National record
N/A = Round not applicable for the event
Bye = Athlete not required to compete in round

Cycling

Road

Gymnastics

Rhythmic
Individual

Squash

Individual

Doubles

Swimming

Men

Triathlon

References

Nations at the 2014 Commonwealth Games
Bermuda at the Commonwealth Games
2014 in Bermudian sport